Javier Alván Salas Salazar (born 20 August 1993) is a Mexican professional footballer who plays as a defensive midfielder for Liga MX club Juárez.

Honours
Cruz Azul
Copa MX: Apertura 2018
Leagues Cup: 2019

Individual
Liga MX All-Star: 2021

References

External links
 

1993 births
Living people
Mexican footballers
Association football midfielders
Dorados de Sinaloa footballers
Club Tijuana footballers
Atlas F.C. footballers
Cruz Azul footballers
Club Puebla players
Liga MX players
Ascenso MX players
Liga Premier de México players
Tercera División de México players
Footballers from Sinaloa
Sportspeople from Culiacán